Golden Lotus Award for Best Newcomer has been awarded annually since 2009 by the Macau Film and Television Media Association and China International Cultural Communication Center.

Award winners and nominees

2000s

2009 (1st)

2010s

2010 (2nd)

2011 (3rd)

2012 (4th)

2013 (5th)

2014 (6th)

2015 (7th)

2016 (8th)

References

External links

Golden Lotus Awards
Awards established in 2009
2009 establishments in Macau
Film awards for male debut actors
Film awards for debut actress